Goon Piper is a hamlet in the parish of Feock, Cornwall, England.

References

Hamlets in Cornwall